Veracini is a surname. Notable people with the surname include:

Agostino Veracini (1689–1762), Italian painter and engraver, cousin of Francesco
Antonio Veracini (1659–1733), Italian composer and violinist 
Francesco Maria Veracini (1690–1768), Italian composer and violinist

Italian-language surnames